Hong Bang International University (HIU) is a private university in Ho Chi Minh City.

HIU has faculties of law, economics, fine arts, foreign languages. The university has been accredited by three US educational organizations as meeting American education standard.

History 

Established in 1997, HIU  became a member of NHG Education System in May 2015.

Programs
HIU offers degree programs in forty disciplines, enrolling an average of 4,000 undergraduate and post-graduate students from Southern Vietnam.  Up to 2017, HIU had more than 66.000 alumni working in Vietnam and APAC.

HIU has received the Labor Order, third class by the President; Merit by the Prime Minister as well as Merit by Central of the Ho chi Minh City Communist Youth Union.

According to UniRank, UNI is ranked 38th in Vietnam. 
Recently, following the assessment of The Ministry of Education and Training, the university is on the strongly recommended list because of high-level education r, international environment and a high qualitycampus.

Admission

Vietnamese students come from mainly Ho chi minh City, Tay Ninh, Vinh Long, Can Tho, Long An, and Binh Thuan. 
HIU has international students from Cuba, Cambodia, Korea, Mongolia, Japan, and Italy . They join both the undergraduate and graduate levels.

References 

Universities in Ho Chi Minh City